The Stillwater River is a river in the U.S. state of Rhode Island. There are four dams along the river's length.

Course
The river is formed by the confluence of Cutler Brook with an unnamed stream, west of the village of Harmony. The river flows in a southeasterly direction to Waterman Lake, then east past the village of Greenville. From there, the river flows in a northerly direction to Stillwater Reservoir where it meets the Woonasquatucket River.

Crossings
Below is a list of all crossings over the Stillwater River. The list starts at the headwaters and goes downstream.
Glocester
Sawmill Road
Smithfield
West Greenville Road
Putnam Pike (U.S. 44)
Austin Avenue
Deerfield Drive
Pleasant View Avenue (RI 5/116)

Tributaries
In addition to many unnamed tributaries, the following brooks feed the Stillwater:
Cutler Brook
Nine Foot Brook
Reaper Brook
Sprague Brook

See also
List of rivers in Rhode Island
Woonasquatucket River
Stillwater Mill

References
Maps from the United States Geological Survey

Rivers of Providence County, Rhode Island
Rivers of Rhode Island
Tributaries of Providence River